Robert James Dorey (born August 17, 1947) is a Canadian former professional ice hockey player who played over 650 professional games in the National Hockey League (NHL) and World Hockey Association (WHA).

Dorey was a defenceman who played for the Toronto Maple Leafs and New York Rangers in the NHL. He also had a long career in the WHA playing for New England Whalers, Toronto Toros and Quebec Nordiques and played on two Avco World Trophy winning teams.

Dorey made his NHL debut with the Maple Leafs on October 16, 1968 in a game against the Pittsburgh Penguins, during which he received 48 penalty minutes, an NHL single-game record at the time. His rugged, aggressive style made him as a Leaf mainstay for the next four seasons. The New York Rangers acquired him for Pierre Jarry late in the 1971–72 season, when Maple Leaf management suspected he might be about to jump to the fledgling WHA. Dorey played just one regular season game with the Rangers before suffering a separated shoulder. He returned to play in game six of the 1972 Stanley Cup Finals. That summer he signed with the WHA's New England Whalers. Dorey became a WHA star for the entire seven seasons of the league's existence.

After his retirement he coached the Kingston Canadians of the Ontario Hockey League. He was inducted into the Kingston and District Sports Hall of Fame.

Dorey ended his career as an Allstate Insurance agent in his hometown, and retired in March 2008. More recently, he opened his own insurance brokerage in Kingston.

Career statistics

Regular season and playoffs

References

External links

1947 births
Living people
Canadian ice hockey defencemen
Canadian ice hockey coaches
Ice hockey people from Ontario
Kingston Canadians coaches
London Nationals players
New England Whalers players
New Haven Nighthawks players
New York Rangers players
Niagara Falls Flyers (1960–1972) players
Philadelphia Firebirds (AHL) players
Phoenix Roadrunners (WHL) players
Quebec Nordiques (WHA) players
Rochester Americans players
Sportspeople from Kingston, Ontario
Toronto Maple Leafs draft picks
Toronto Maple Leafs players
Toronto Toros players
Tulsa Oilers (1964–1984) players